Toronto Lake may refer to:

Lakes in Canada 
Toronto Lake (Muskoka District, Ontario)
Toronto Lake (Rainy River District, Ontario)
Toronto Lake (Thunder Bay District, Ontario)
Toronto Lake (Northwest Territories)
Lake Simcoe was referred to as Lake Taronto or Lake Toronto in the 19th century.

Lakes in the United States 
Toronto Lake (Kansas)
Toronto Lake (New York)